Land of Make Believe is the eighth album by jazz artist Chuck Mangione. The title song is sung by Esther Satterfield. It also features Mangione's older brother Gap Mangione and jazz trumpet player Jon Faddis.

Track listing
All songs written by Chuck Mangione

Personnel
 Chuck Mangione - flugelhorn, mixing, orchestration, conductor, arranger
 Joseph C. Crupi - conductor, director
 Marta Hidy - concertmaster, violin
 Gap Mangione - electric piano, toy instruments
 Catherine Lehr, Edgar Hayes, Zdenek Konicek - cello
 Ned Corman, Paula Elliott, Gordon Johnson, Gerry Niewood, Ray Ricker, Joe Romano - flute
 Charles Daellenbach - tuba
 Eugene Watts, Bill Reichenbach Jr., Janice Robinson, Art Linser III - trombone
 Robert Hansen, Gregory Hustis, Graeme Page, Brad Warnaar - French horn
 Jon Faddis, Jeff Tyzik, Fred Mills, Ronald Romm - trumpet
 Barbara Hustis, Jaroslav Karlovský, Ann Armin - viola
 David Hung, Rudolph Kalup, Christine Haarvig, Beth Gorevic, Natalie Mysko, Margaret Neufeld, Kathryn Wunder, Michel Zaitzeff - violin
 Ray Ricker, Joe Romano - tenor saxophone
 Esther Satterfield - vocals
 Ron Berger, Scott Bump, Jeff Bowlby, Steve Russell - tenor vocals
 Kathleen Collins, Barbara Hendricks, Terry Lodge - alto vocals
 Jan Walp - soprano vocals 
 Russ Cembrinski, Michael Cleveland, Jim Smith, Jeff Wilber, Jim Wilber - bass vocals
 Al Johnson - electric bass
 Joe LaBarbera - drums
 Steve Gadd - drums
 Ron Davis - percussion
 Tom Elliot, John Courtney - bassoon
 David Young, Jack McFadden - string bass
 Don Potter - guitar

Production
 Bob Ludwig - mastering
 Phil Ramone - editing, engineering, mixing
 Richard Seidel - producer
 Richie Blakin - editing, mixing
 Dennis Drake - remixing
 Robin McBride - production assistant

References

1973 albums
Chuck Mangione albums
Mercury Records albums
Crossover jazz albums
Albums recorded at Massey Hall